The seventh season of American crime-comedy-drama television series Castle, was ordered on May 8, 2014, by ABC. The season premiered on September 29, 2014, in the United States on ABC, and the finale aired on May 11, 2015. The seventh season initially had 22 episodes. But on October 23, 2014, ABC ordered one more episode, resulting in an episode count of 23 episodes.

Overview
Richard Castle (Fillion) is a famous mystery novelist who has killed off the main character in his popular book series and has writer's block. He is brought in by the NYPD for questioning regarding a copy-cat murder based on one of his novels. He is intrigued by this new window into crime and murder, and uses his connection with the mayor to charm his way into shadowing Detective Kate Beckett (Katic). Castle decides to use Beckett as his muse for Nikki Heat, the main character of his next book series. Beckett, an avid reader of Castle's books, initially disapproves of having Castle shadow her work, but later warms up and recognizes Castle as a useful resource in her team's investigations.

Cast

Main cast
 Nathan Fillion as Richard Castle
 Stana Katic as Dt. Kate Castle
 Jon Huertas as Dt. Javier Esposito
 Seamus Dever as Dt. Kevin Ryan
 Tamala Jones as Dr. Lanie Parish
 Molly C. Quinn as Alexis Castle
 Susan Sullivan as Martha Rodgers
 Penny Johnson Jerald as Captain Victoria Gates

Recurring cast
 Maya Stojan as Tory Ellis
 Arye Gross as Sidney Perlmutter
 Juliana Dever as Jenny Ryan
 Matt Letscher as Henry Jenkins

Episodes

DVD release

Awards and nominations

References

2014 American television seasons
2015 American television seasons
Season 7